Noakhali Government College is a public college in Noakhali, Bangladesh established in 1963. The college is affiliated with National University.

History 
Noakhali Government College was founded on 1 March 1963. It was nationalize in 1968. And the land was given by Mr. Chintaharan Chatterjee. The first principal of this college was Mr. A.k. Mohammad Ullah. Higher Secondary Certificate (HSC) started in this college in first July, 1963. Degree (Pass) started in this college in 1965. After creating National University, the college came under it. And then, the honours level started in 1991 and the masters (finale) started in 1995.

Notable alumni 
 Obaidul Quader, current Road Transport and Bridges minister of Bangladesh

See also
 List of universities in Bangladesh
Alokdia High School
Madhupur Shahid Smrity Higher Secondary School
Madhupur Rani Bhabani High School
Madhupur College

References

External links
 

Colleges in Noakhali District
Universities and colleges in Noakhali District
1963 establishments in East Pakistan